The 2016 World Rugby Americas Pacific Challenge was the inaugural rugby union tournament created by World Rugby for national 'A' teams to develop home grown talent for their national test sides.

The Americas Pacific Challenge provides the Pacific nations a chance of further competition outside their own region, as the Pacific Challenge is reduced to just the Pacific nations when Rugby World Cup qualifiers are played.

For national 'A' teams from the Americas, this new tournament replaced the pre-2015 format of the Americas Rugby Championship, which is now an annual championship elevated to test status. 

The tournament was hosted by Uruguay, with all matches played at the 14,000 capacity stadium Estadio Charrúa in Montevideo. Argentina XV won the tournament undefeated, with Fiji Warriors as runner-up.

Format
With six teams in the tournament and a limitation of three matches per team, a "split pool" format was used. The field was split into two pools, with teams in one pool only playing the teams in the other. The competing teams were:  

Group A

Group B

Table
Final standings for combined pools:

Fixtures
The matches were announced on 7 September 2016.

All times are local UYT (UTC-03)

Round 1

Round 2

Round 3

See also
 2016 end-of-year rugby union internationals
 Americas Rugby Championship
 World Rugby Pacific Challenge

References

External links
 

Americas Pacific Challenge 2016 official webpage at worldrugby.org 

World Rugby Americas Pacific Challenge
Americas Pacific
2016 in Oceanian sport
2016 in Fijian rugby union
2016 in Samoan rugby union
2016 in Uruguayan sport
2016 in Argentine rugby union
2016 in Canadian rugby union
2016 in American rugby union
International rugby union competitions hosted by Uruguay